Brent Miller may refer to:

Brent Miller (actor), Canadian actor and voice actor
Brent Miller (producer) (born 1975), American film and television producer

See also
Miller (surname)